Leonid Kostylev is a Russian amateur boxer who won the gold medal at the 2008 European Amateur Boxing Championships in the lightweight division.

Russian national championships
Kostylev won a gold medal in the 2008 Lightweight Russian senior national championships beating Eduard Khusainov in the final by 14:3.

European Amateur Championships
Following his victory in the national championships Kostylev then represented Russia at the 2008 European Amateur Boxing Championships in Liverpool, England. He won a gold medal after defeating Belarus' Vazgen Safaryants 7:3 in the final.

European Championships results
2008 (as a Featherweight)
Preliminary round - BYE
Second round Defeated Steven Sharoudi (Scotland) 9:5
Quarter Finals Defeated Rachid Azzedine (France) 9:3
Semi Finals Defeated Miklós Varga (Hungary) 11:2
Finals Defeated Vazgen Safaryants (Belarus) 7:3

References

1989 births
Living people
Lightweight boxers
Russian male boxers